Thomas or Tom Bailey may refer to:

Sports
 Tom Bailey (footballer) (1888–?), English footballer
 Thomas Bailey (footballer, born 1904) (1904–1983), Welsh footballer
 Tom Bailey (American football) (1949–2005), American football player
 Tom Bailey (cricketer) (born 1991), English cricketer
 Tom Bailey (baseball) (born 1992), Australian baseball player

Writers
 Thomas Bailey (topographer) (1785–1856), English topographer and writer
 Thomas A. Bailey (1902–1983), American historian and textbook author
 Tom Bailey (author) (born 1961), American author and editor

Characters
 Tom Bailey (EastEnders), character in EastEnders
 Thomas Bailey, the father of Will Bailey, character on U.S. TV series The West Wing

Others
 Thomas Bailey (priest) (died 1657), 17th century English religious controversialist
 Thomas P. Bailey (1867–1949), American educator
 Thomas Jennings Bailey (1867–1963), U.S. federal judge
 Thomas L. Bailey (1888–1946), American politician, Governor of Mississippi, 1944–1946
 Thomas D. Bailey (1897–1974), American educator 
 Thomas H. Bailey (born 1936/37), American financier and founder of mutual fund Janus
 Tom Bailey (musician) (born 1956), English musician
 Tom Bailey (singer) (fl. 2015–2017), English singer and producer

See also
 Thomas Baillie (disambiguation)
 Thomas Bailly, Leicester MP
 Thomas Bayley (disambiguation)
 Thomas Bayly (disambiguation)